Hall for Cornwall, known as Truro City Hall until 1997, is an events venue in Boscawen Street in Truro, Cornwall, England. The building, which was previously the headquarters of Truro City Council, is a Grade II* listed building.

History

The first municipal building in Truro was a 17th-century market house, which was arcaded on the ground floor so that markets could be held, with an assembly hall on the first floor. It was replaced with a more substantial structure in 1809 but when that was also found to be inadequate, civic leaders commissioned a new building on the same site in the early 1840s.

The new building was designed by Christopher Eales in the Italianate style, built in granite ashlar stone and completed in 1846. The design involved a symmetrical main frontage with five bays facing onto Boscawen Street; the ground floor was arcaded and rusticated, while the first floor had sash windows with triangular pediments on the central and outer windows and with segmental pediments on the other windows. There were quoins at the corners and at roof level there was a heavily modillioned cornice. Internally, the north end of the complex accommodated the municipal buildings, which included a courtroom and a council chamber, while the south end accommodated a market hall.

A clocktower was installed on the Boscawen Street frontage in 1858 and the suffragette, Helen Beedy, gave a speech advocating voting rights for women at a public meeting in the building in December 1874. In 1877, when Truro became a city, the complex was renamed Truro City Hall. In the early 20th century civic leaders decided to make the market hall at the rear of the complex available for public use. This resulted in the market hall being operated as a skating rink in 1907 and then as a cinema in 1912. After a fire gutted most of the building in 1914, the market hall was remodelled as a theatre with a stage in 1925 and, following a period of neglect in the 1960s, it served as a flea market in the 1970s. The rock band, Queen, played their first live concert in the building on 27 June 1970.

The municipal buildings continued to serve as the headquarters of Truro City Council for much of the 20th century, but ceased to be the local seat of government after the enlarged Carrick District Council was formed at offices in Pydar Street in 1974.

After a major refurbishment in the mid-1990s, the former market hall at the rear of the complex re-opened as Hall for Cornwall on 15 November 1997. In September 2008 the venue put on a re-working of the play, The Jew of Malta by Christopher Marlowe, entitled Barabas, which featured a Cornish, national and international cast. The venue then became one of a number of organisations involved in Cornwall Council's proposed National Theatre of Cornwall, when the initiative was launched in February 2012. Christmas shows, directed by locally based director and producer, Simon Harvey, included Dick Whittington and his Mousehole Cat! in December 2016 and Jack and the Beanstalk - A gigantic adventure! in December 2017.

A major programme of refurbishment works, which are being undertaken by Kier Group at a cost of £20 million to a design by Burrell Foley Fischer, began in June 2018. The project involves a completely new auditorium, located in the centre of the complex, increasing the capacity of the venue from 965 seats to 1,354 seats: it will be accessed from the north end of the complex, i.e. Boscawen Street, whereas the old auditorium was accessed from the south end of the complex, i.e. Back Quay. Although the venue will continued to be called Hall for Cornwall, the new auditorium will be known as The Cornwall Playhouse when it opens later in 2021.

See also

 Grade II* listed buildings in Cornwall

References

External links

 Official site

Government buildings completed in 1846
City and town halls in Cornwall
Truro
Grade II* listed buildings in Cornwall
Entertainment in Cornwall
Theatres in Cornwall
1846 establishments in England